The Ukraine national futsal team represents Ukraine in international futsal competitions such as the FIFA Futsal World Cup and the European Championships and is controlled by the Football Federation of Ukraine.

History
In the 2008 FIFA Futsal World Cup qualification stage Ukraine finished top of Group 10 ahead of Israel, Moldova and Bulgaria. In the knockout stage of the qualification process, they advanced after beating Hungary 6:5 on aggregate (3:1 home, 3:4 away). The last stage of the 2008 FIFA Futsal World Cup took place from 30 September 2008 till 19 October 2008 in Rio, Brazil and was the largest ever edition of the tournament at the time containing 20 teams. Ukraine has history in the tournament, having a fourth-place finish in 1996 and a top eight finish in 2004, 2008 and 2012.

Tournament records

FIFA Futsal World Cup

UEFA European Futsal Championship

Grand Prix de Futsal

Players

Current squad
The following players were called up to the squad for the UEFA Futsal Euro 2022.
Head coach: Oleksandr Kosenko

Recent call-ups
The following players have been called up for the team within the last 12 months.

Head coaches
 Gennadiy Lisenchuk – from 1994 till 2012
 Yevgen Ryvkin – from 9 January 2013

Results and fixtures

2021

2020

2014

References

External links
 Futsal Association of Ukraine (ukr)

 
Ukraine
national
1994 establishments in Ukraine
Futsal clubs established in 1994